Test of Wills is the third studio album by the progressive metal/rock band Magellan.

Track listing

"Gameface" - 4:30
"A Social Marginal" - 7:29
"Walk Fast, Look Worried" - 5:54
"Test of Wills" - 11:28
"Bully Pulpit (Part I)" - 2:01
"Jacko" - 4:23
"Crucible" - 5:00
"Preaching the Converted" - 5:31
"Critic's Carnival" - 9:02

Personnel 
Trent Gardner - lead vocals, keyboards, trombone
Wayne Gardner - guitars, bass, backing vocals
Brad Kaiser - drums, percussion

References

External links
Encyclopaedia Metallum page

Magellan (band) albums
1997 albums